Format of entries is:
 ICAO (IATA) – Airport name – Airport location

SA - Argentina 

 SAAA – San Antonio de Areco Airport – San Antonio de Areco, Buenos Aires Province
 SAAC (COC) – Concordia Airport – Concordia, Entre Ríos
 SAAG (GHU) – Gualeguaychú Airport – Gualeguaychú, Entre Ríos
 SAAJ (JNI) – Junín Airport – Junín, Buenos Aires (closed)
 SAAK – Martín García Island Airport – Martín García Island, Buenos Aires Province
 SAAM – Mazaruca Airport
 SAAN – Pergamino Aeroclub – Pergamino Aeroclub, Buenos Aires Province
 SAAP (PRA) – General Justo José de Urquiza Airport – Paraná, Entre Ríos
 SAAR (ROS) – Rosario – Islas Malvinas International Airport – Rosario, Santa Fe
 SAAU – Villaguay Aerodrome – Villaguay, Entre Ríos Province
 SAAV (SFN) – Sauce Viejo Airport – Santa Fe
 SABA (BUE) – National Weather Service - Central Observatory – Buenos Aires
 SABC – Fuerza Aérea (Edificio Cóndor) Heliport
 SABE (AEP) – Aeroparque Jorge Newbery – Buenos Aires
 SACA – Capitán Omar Darío Gerardi Airport – Córdoba
 SACC (LCM) – La Cumbre Airport – La Cumbre, Córdoba
 SACD – Coronel Olmedo Airport
 SACE – Escuela de Aviación Militar Airport – Córdoba
 SACM – Villa General Mitre Airport – Villa del Totoral, Córdoba Province (closed)
 SACN – Ascochinga Airport – Ascochinga, Córdoba Province
 SACO (COR) – Ingeniero Aeronáutico Ambrosio L.V. Taravella International Airport – Córdoba
 SACP – Chepes Airport – Chepes, La Rioja Province
 SACQ – Monte Quemado Airport – Monte Quemado, Santiago del Estero Province
 SACS – Villa de Soto Airport
 SACT – Chamical Airport – Chamical, La Rioja Province
 SACV – Villa María de Río Seco Airport – Villa de María del Río Seco, Córdoba Province (closed)
 SADD – Don Torcuato Aerodrome – Don Torcuato, Buenos Aires Province (closed)
 SADF – San Fernando Airport – San Fernando, Buenos Aires Province
 SADJ – Mariano Moreno Airport – José C. Paz, Buenos Aires
 SADL (LPG) – La Plata Airport – La Plata, Buenos Aires Province
 SADM – Morón Airport and Air Base – Morón, Buenos Aires
 SADO – Campo de Mayo Military Airport - Army Air Service Main Base and Border Police Air Base – San Miguel, Buenos Aires northwest of downtown
 SADP (EPA) – El Palomar Airport – El Palomar
 SADQ – Quilmes Airport – Quilmes, Buenos Aires Province
 SADR – Villa de Merlo Airport – Villa de Merlo, San Luis Province (closed)
 SADS – Aeroclub Argentino – San Justo, Buenos Aires
 SADZ – Univ. Río Matanza Aeroclub – La Matanza Partido, Buenos Aires Province
 SAEA – General Acha Airport – General Acha, La Pampa Province
 SAEL – Las Flores Airport – Las Flores, Buenos Aires
 SAEM (MJR) – Miramar Airport – Miramar, Buenos Aires
 SAET – Ñanco Lauquen Airport – Trenque Lauquen, Buenos Aires Province
 SAEZ (EZE) – Ministro Pistarini International Airport (Ezeiza International Airport) – Ezeiza, Buenos Aires
 SAFE – Santa Fé Airport – Santa Fe (closed)
 SAFR (RAF) – Rafaela Aerodrome – Rafaela, Santa Fe Province
 SAFS (NCJ) – Sunchales Aeroclub Airport – Sunchales, Santa Fe
 SAHC (HOS) – Chos Malal Airport – Chos Malal, Neuquén Province
 SAHE (CVH) – Caviahue Airport – Caviahue, Neuquén Province
 SAHR (GNR) – Dr. Arturo Umberto Illia Airport – General Roca, Río Negro
 SAHS (RDS) – Rincón de los Sauces Airport – Rincón de Los Sauces, Neuquén Province
 SAHZ (APZ) – Zapala Airport – Zapala, Neuquén Province
 SAMA – General Alvear Airport – General Alvear, Mendoza (closed)
 SAME (MDZ) – Governor Francisco Gabrielli International Airport (El Plumerillo International Airport) – Mendoza, Mendoza Province
 SAMI – San Martín Airport – San Martín, Mendoza
 SAMJ – Jáchal Airport – San José de Jáchal, San Juan Province (closed)
 SAML – Punta de Vacas Heliport – Punta de Vacas, Mendoza Province
 SAMM (LGS) – Comodoro D. Ricardo Salomón Airport – Malargüe, Mendoza Province
 SAMP – La Paz Aeroclub – La Paz, Entre Ríos
 SAMQ – Ciudad de Mendoza Airpark – Mendoza
 SAMR (AFA) – San Rafael Airport – San Rafael, Mendoza Province
 SAMS – San Carlos Airport – San Carlos, Mendoza
 SAMT – Uspallata Airport – Uspallata, Mendoza Province
 SANC (CTC) – Coronel Felipe Varela Airport – Catamarca, Catamarca Province
 SANE (SDE) – Vicecomodoro Ángel de la Paz Aragonés Airport – Santiago del Estero, Santiago del Estero Province
 SANI – Tinogasta Airport – Tinogasta, Catamarca Province
 SANL (IRJ) – Capitán Vicente Almandos Almonacid Airport – La Rioja
 SANO – Chilecito Airport – Chilecito, La Rioja Province
 SANR (RHD) – Las Termas Airport – Termas de Río Hondo, Santiago del Estero Province
 SANT (TUC) – Tte. Gral. Benjamín Matienzo International Airport (Lt. Gen. Benjamín Matienzo) – Tucumán, Tucumán Province
 SANU (UAQ) – Domingo Faustino Sarmiento Airport – San Juan
 SANW (CRR) – Ceres Airport – Ceres, Santa Fe Province
 SAOC (RCU) – Las Higueras Airport – Río Cuarto, Córdoba
 SAOD (VDR) – Villa Dolores Airport – Villa Dolores, Córdoba Province
 SAOE – Río Tercero Airport – Río Tercero, Córdoba
 SAOL – Laboulaye Airport – Laboulaye, Córdoba
 SAOM – Marcos Juárez Airport – Marcos Juárez, Córdoba Province
 SAOR (VME) – Villa Reynolds Airport – Villa Reynolds, San Luis Province
 SAOS (RLO) – Valle del Conlara Airport – Villa de Merlo, San Luis Province
 SAOU (LUQ) – San Luis Airport – San Luis
 SAOV (RLO) – Valle del Conlara Airport – Villa de Merlo, San Luis Province
 SARC (CNQ) – Doctor Fernando Piragine Niveyro International Airport – Corrientes, Corrientes Province
 SARE (RES) – Resistencia International Airport – Resistencia, Chaco
 SARF (FMA) – Formosa International Airport – Formosa, Formosa Province
 SARI (IGR) – Cataratas del Iguazú International Airport (Iguazú Falls) – Puerto Iguazú, Misiones Province
 SARL (AOL) – Paso de los Libres Airport – Paso de los Libres, Corrientes Province
 SARM (MCS) – Monte Caseros Airport – Monte Caseros, Corrientes
 SARO – Ituzaingó Yacireta Airport – Ituzaingó, Corrientes
 SARP (PSS) – Libertador General José de San Martín Airport – Posadas, Misiones
 SARR – Resistencia Aeroclub – Resistencia, Chaco Province
 SARS (PRQ) – Presidencia Roque Sáenz Peña Airport – Presidencia Roque Sáenz Peña, Chaco Province
 SARV – Villa Angela Airport – Villa Ángela, Chaco Province
 SASA (SLA) – Martín Miguel de Güemes International Airport (El Aybal Airport) – Salta, Salta Province
 SASJ (JUJ) – Gobernador Horacio Guzmán International Airport – San Salvador de Jujuy, Jujuy Province
 SASO (ORA) – Orán Airport – Orán, Salta Province
 SASQ – La Quiaca Airport – La Quiaca, Jujuy Province
 SASR – Rivadavia Airport – Rivadavia, Mendoza Province
 SAST (TTG) – Tartagal "General Enrique Mosconi" Airport – Tartagal, Salta Province
 SATC (CLX) – Clorinda Airport – Clorinda, Formosa Province
 SATD (ELO) – El Dorado Airport – Eldorado, Misiones
 SATG (OYA) – Goya Airport – Goya, Corrientes Province
 SATI – Bernardo de Irigoyen Airport – Bernardo de Irigoyen, Misiones
 SATK (LLS) – Alférez Armando Rodríguez Airport – Las Lomitas, Formosa Province
 SATM (MDX) – Mercedes Airport – Mercedes, Corrientes
 SATO – Oberá Airport – Oberá, Misiones Province
 SATR (RCQ) – Daniel Jurkic Airport – Reconquista, Santa Fe
 SATU (UZU) – Curuzú Cuatiá Airport – Curuzú Cuatiá, Corrientes Province
 SAVB (EHL) – El Bolsón Airport – El Bolsón, Río Negro Province
 SAVC (CRD) – General Enrique Mosconi Airport – Comodoro Rivadavia, Chubut Province
 SAVD (EMX) – El Maitén Airport – El Maitén, Chubut Province
 SAVE (EQS) – Esquel Airport – Esquel, Chubut Province
 SAVH (LHS) – Colonia Las Heras Airport – Las Heras, Santa Cruz
 SAVJ (IGB) – Ingeniero Jacobacci Airport – Ingeniero Jacobacci, Río Negro Province
 SAVN (OES) – Antoine de Saint Exupéry Airport – San Antonio Oeste, Río Negro Province
 SAVQ (MQD) – Maquinchao Airport – Maquinchao, Río Negro Province
 SAVR (ARR) – Alto Río Senguer Airport – Alto Río Senguer, Chubut Province
 SAVS (SGV) – Sierra Grande Airport – Sierra Grande, Río Negro
 SAVT (REL) – Almirante Marcos A. Zar Airport – Trelew, Chubut Province
 SAVV (VDM) – Gobernador Edgardo Castello Airport – Viedma, Río Negro
 SAVY (PMY) – El Tehuelche Airport – Puerto Madryn, Chubut Province
 SAWA (ING) – Lago Argentino Airport – Lago Argentino, Santa Cruz Province (closed)
 SAWC (FTE) – Comandante Armando Tola International Airport – El Calafate, Santa Cruz Province
 SAWD (PUD) – Puerto Deseado Airport – Puerto Deseado, Santa Cruz Province
 SAWE (RGA) – Hermes Quijada International Airport – Río Grande, Tierra del Fuego
 SAWG (RGL) – Piloto Civil Norberto Fernández International Airport – Río Gallegos, Santa Cruz
 SAWH (USH) – Ushuaia – Malvinas Argentinas International Airport – Ushuaia, Tierra del Fuego Province
 SAWJ (ULA) – Capitán José Daniel Vazquez Airport – San Julián, Santa Cruz Province
 SAWL – Tolhuin Lago Fagnano Airport – Tolhuin, Tierra del Fuego Province
 SAWM (ROY) – Río Mayo Airport – Río Mayo, Chubut
 SAWO - Ushuaia Aeroclub - Ushuaia, Tierra del Fuego Province
 SAWP (PMQ) – Perito Moreno Airport – Perito Moreno, Santa Cruz
 SAWR (GGS) – Gobernador Gregores Airport – Gobernador Gregores, Santa Cruz Province
 SAWS (JSM) – José de San Martín Airport – José de San Martín, Chubut Province
 SAWT (RYO) – Rio Turbio Airport – Río Turbio, Santa Cruz Province
 SAWU (RZA) – Santa Cruz Airport – Puerto Santa Cruz
 SAZA – Azul Airport – Azul, Buenos Aires
 SAZB (BHI) – Comandante Espora Airport – Bahía Blanca, Buenos Aires Province
 SAZC (CSZ) – Brigadier Hector Eduardo Ruiz Airport – Coronel Suárez, Buenos Aires Province
 SAZD – Dolores Airport – Dolores, Buenos Aires
 SAZE – Pigüé Airport – Pigüé, Buenos Aires Province
 SAZF (OVR) – Olavarría Airport – Olavarría, Buenos Aires Province
 SAZG (GPO) – General Pico Airport – General Pico, La Pampa Province
 SAZH (OYO) – Tres Arroyos Airport – Tres Arroyos, Buenos Aires Province
 SAZI – Bolívar Airport – Bolívar, Buenos Aires Province
 SAZJ – Benito Juárez Airport – Benito Juárez, Buenos Aires
 SAZK – Cerro Catedral Heliport – Cerro Catedral, Chubut Province
 SAZL (SST) – Santa Teresita Airport – Santa Teresita, Buenos Aires
 SAZM (MDQ) – Astor Piazzolla International Airport – Mar del Plata, Buenos Aires Province
 SAZN (NQN) – Presidente Perón International Airport – Neuquén, Neuquén Province
 SAZO (NEC) – Necochea Airport – Necochea, Buenos Aires Province
 SAZP (PEH) – Comodoro P. Zanni Airport – Pehuajó, Buenos Aires Province
 SAZQ – Río Colorado Airport – Río Colorado, Río Negro
 SAZR (RSA) – Santa Rosa Airport – Santa Rosa, La Pampa
 SAZS (BRC) – San Carlos de Bariloche Airport – San Carlos de Bariloche, Río Negro Province
 SAZT (TDL) – Tandil Airport – Tandil, Buenos Aires Province
 SAZU – Puelches Airport – Puelches, La Pampa
 SAZV (VLG) – Villa Gesell Airport – Villa Gesell, Buenos Aires Province
 SAZW (CUT) – Cutral Có Airport – Cutral Có, Neuquén Province
 SAZX – Nueve de Julio Airport – Nueve de Julio, Buenos Aires
 SAZY (CPC) – Aviador Carlos Campos Airport (Chapelco Airport) – San Martín de los Andes, Neuquén Province

SB SD SI SJ SN SS SW - Brazil

SB 
 SBAA (CDJ) – Conceição do Araguaia Airport – Conceição do Araguaia, Pará
 SBAC (ARX) – Dragão do Mar Airport  – Aracati, Ceará
 SBAE (JTC) – Moussa Nakhal Tobias Airport  – Bauru / Arealva, São Paulo
 SBAN (APS) – Anápolis Air Base – Anápolis, Goiás
 SBAQ (AQA) – Araraquara Airport – Araraquara, São Paulo
 SBAR (AJU) – Santa Maria Airport – Aracaju, Sergipe
 SBAS (AIF) – Assis Airport – Assis, São Paulo
 SBAT (AFL) – Alta Floresta Airport – Alta Floresta, Mato Grosso
 SBAU (ARU) – Araçatuba Airport – Araçatuba, São Paulo
 SBAX (AAX) – Romeu Zema Airport – Araxá, Minas Gerais
 SBBE (BEL) – Val de Cans International Airport – Belém, Pará
 SBBG (BGX) – Comandante Gustavo Kraemer Airport – Bagé, Rio Grande do Sul
 SBBH (PLU) – Pampulha Domestic Airport – Belo Horizonte, Minas Gerais
 SBBI (BFH) – Bacacheri Airport – Curitiba, Paraná
 SBBP (BJP) – Bragança Paulista Airport – Bragança Paulista, São Paulo
 SBBQ (QAK) – Barbacena Airport – Barbacena, Minas Gerais
 SBBR (BSB) – Presidente Juscelino Kubitschek International Airport – Brasília, Federal District
 SBBT (BAT) – Chafei Amsei Airport – Barretos, São Paulo
 SBBU (BAU) – Bauru Airport – Bauru, São Paulo
 SBBV (BVB) – Boa Vista International Airport – Boa Vista, Roraima
 SBBW (BPG) – Barra do Garças Airport – Barra do Garças, Mato Grosso
 SBBZ (BZC) – Umberto Modiano Airport – Búzios, Rio de Janeiro
 SBCA (CAC) – Cascavel Airport – Cascavel, Paraná
 SBCB (CFB) – Cabo Frio International Airport – Cabo Frio, Rio de Janeiro
 SBCC (ITB) – Cachimbo Airport – Itaituba, Pará
 SBCD (CFC) – Caçador Airport (Carlos Alberto da Costa Neves Airport) – Caçador, Brazil
 SBCF (CNF) – Tancredo Neves International Airport – Belo Horizonte, Minas Gerais
 SBCG (CGR) – Campo Grande International Airport – Campo Grande, Mato Grosso do Sul
 SBCH (XAP) – Chapecó Airport – Chapecó, Santa Catarina
 SBCI (CLN) – Carolina Airport – Carolina, Maranhão
 SBCJ (CKS) – Carajás Airport – Carajás Mine, Pará
 SBCM (CCM) – Diomício Freitas Airport – Criciúma, Santa Catarina
 SBCO (QNS) – Canoas Air Force Base – Porto Alegre, Rio Grande do Sul
 SBCP (CAW) – Bartolomeu Lysandro Airport – Campos, Rio de Janeiro
 SBCR (CMG) – Corumbá International Airport – Corumbá, Mato Grosso do Sul
 SBCT (CWB) – Afonso Pena International Airport – Curitiba, Paraná
 SBCV (CRQ) – Caravelas Airport – Caravelas, Bahia
 SBCX (CXJ) – Caxias do Sul Airport – Caxias do Sul, Rio Grande do Sul
 SBCY (CGB) – Marechal Rondon Airport – Cuiabá, Mato Grosso
 SBCZ (CZS) – Cruzeiro do Sul International Airport – Cruzeiro do Sul, Acre
 SBDB (BYO) – Bonito Airport – Bonito, Mato Grosso do Sul
 SBDN (PPB) – Presidente Prudente Airport – Presidente Prudente, São Paulo
 SBDO (PPB) – Francisco de Matos Pereira Airport – Dourados, Mato Grosso do Sul
 SBEG (MAO) – Eduardo Gomes International Airport – Manaus, Amazonas
 SBEK (JCR) – Jacare-Acanga Airport – Jacareacanga, Pará
 SBFI (IGU) – Foz do Iguaçu International Airport (Cataratas Int'l) – Foz do Iguaçu, Paraná
 SBFL (FLN) – Hercílio Luz International Airport – Florianópolis, Santa Catarina
 SBFN (FEN) – Fernando de Noronha Airport – Fernando de Noronha, Pernambuco
 SBFS – Farol de São Tomé Airport – Campos dos Goytacazes, Rio de Janeiro 
SBFZ (FOR) – Pinto Martins International Airport – Fortaleza, Ceará
 SBGL (GIG) – Rio de Janeiro/Galeão International Airport – Rio de Janeiro, Rio de Janeiro
 SBGM (GJM) – Guajará-Mirim Airport – Guajará-Mirim, Rondônia
 SBGO (GYN) – Santa Genoveva Airport – Goiânia, Goiás
 SBGP – Embraer Unidade Gavião Peixoto Airport – Gavião Peixoto, São Paulo
 SBGR (GRU) – São Paulo/Guarulhos International Airport – São Paulo, São Paulo
 SBGS (PGZ) – Ponta Grossa Airport – Ponta Grossa, Paraná
 SBGV (GVR) – Cel. Altino Machado de Oliveira Airport – Governador Valadares, Minas Gerais
 SBGW (GUJ) – Guaratinguetá Airport – Guaratinguetá, São Paulo
 SBHT (ATM) – Altamira Airport – Altamira, Pará
 SBIC (ITA) – Itacoatiara Airport – Itacoatiara, Amazonas
 SBIH (ITB) – Itaituba Airport – Itaituba, Pará
 SBIL (IOS) – Ilhéus Jorge Amado Airport – Ilhéus, Bahia
 SBIP (IPN) – Usiminas Airport – Ipatinga, Minas Gerais
 SBIT (ITR) – Itumbiara Airport – Itumbiara, Goiás
 SBIZ (IMP) – Imperatriz Airport – Imperatriz, Maranhão
 SBJA (JJG) – Humberto Ghizzo Bortoluzzi Regional Airport – Jaguaruna, Santa Catarina
 SBJC – Protásio de Oliveira Airport – Belém, Pará
 SBJD (QDV) – Jundiaí Airport – Jundiaí, São Paulo
 SBJE (JJD) – Comte. Ariston Pessoa Regional Airport – Jijoca de Jericoacoara / Cruz, Ceará
 SBJF (JDF) – Francisco de Assis Airport – Juiz de Fora, Minas Gerais
 SBJH – São Paulo Catarina Executive Airport – São Roque, São Paulo
 SBJI (JPR) – José Coleto Airport – Ji-Paraná, Rondônia
 SBJP (JPA) – Presidente Castro Pinto International Airport – João Pessoa, Paraíba
 SBJR – Jacarepaguá Airport – Rio de Janeiro, Rio de Janeiro
 SBJU (JDO) – Juazeiro do Norte Airport – Juazeiro do Norte, Ceará
 SBJV (JOI) – Joinville-Lauro Carneiro de Loyola Airport – Joinville, Santa Catarina
 SBKG (CPV) – Campina Grande Airport – Campina Grande, Paraíba
 SBKP (VCP) – Viracopos International Airport – Campinas, São Paulo
 SBLB (LBR) – Lábrea Airport – Lábrea, Amazonas
 SBLE (LEC) – Cel. Horácio de Mattos Airport – Lençóis, Bahia
 SBLJ (LAJ) – Lages Airport – Lages, Santa Catarina
 SBLN (LIP) – Lins Airport – Lins, São Paulo
 SBLO (LDB) – Londrina Airport – Londrina, Paraná
 SBLP (LAZ) – Bom Jesus da Lapa Airport – Bom Jesus da Lapa, Bahia
 SBMA (MAB) – Marabá Airport – Marabá, Pará
 SBMC (MQH) – Minaçu Airport – Minaçu, Goiás
 SBMD (MEU) – Monte Dourado Airport – Monte Dourado, Pará
 SBME (MEA) – Macaé Airport – Macaé, Rio de Janeiro
 SBMG (MGF) – Maringá - Sílvio Name Júnior Regional Airport – Maringá, Paraná
 SBMI – Maricá Airport – Maricá, Rio de Janeiro
 SBMK (MOC) – Montes Claros Airport – Montes Claros, Minas Gerais
 SBML (MII) – Marília Airport – Marília, São Paulo
 SBMN (PLL) – Ponta Pelada Airport – Manaus, Amazonas
 SBMO (MCZ) – Zumbi dos Palmares Airport (Campo dos Palmares) – Maceió, Alagoas
 SBMQ (MCP) – Macapá International Airport – Macapá, Amapá
 SBMS (MVF) – Mossoró Airport – Mossoró, Rio Grande do Norte
 SBMT (SAO) – Campo de Marte Airport – São Paulo, São Paulo
 SBMY (MNX) – Manicoré Airport – Manicoré, Amazonas
 SBNF (NVT) – Ministro Victor Konder International Airport – Navegantes, Santa Catarina
 SBNM (GEL) – Santo Ângelo Airport – Santo Ângelo, Rio Grande do Sul
 SBNT (NAT) – Augusto Severo International Airport – Natal, Rio Grande do Norte
 SBNV – Aeródromo Nacional de Aviação – Goiânia, Goiás
 SBOI (OYK) – Oiapoque Airport – Oiapoque, Amapá
 SBOU (OUS) – Ourinhos Airport – Ourinhos, São Paulo
 SBPA (POA) – Salgado Filho International Airport – Porto Alegre, Rio Grande do Sul
 SBPB (PHB) – Parnaíba-Prefeito Dr. João Silva Filho International Airport – Piauí, Parnaíba
 SBPC (POO) – Poços de Caldas Airport – Poços de Caldas, Minas Gerais
 SBPF (PFB) – Lauro Kurtz Airport – Passo Fundo, Rio Grande do Sul
 SBPG (PNG) – Paranaguá Airport – Paranaguá, Paraná
 SBPI (QPE) – Pico do Couto Airport – Petrópolis, Rio de Janeiro
 SBPJ (PMW) – Palmas Airport – Palmas, Tocantins
 SBPK (PET) – Pelotas International Airport – Pelotas, Rio Grande do Sul
 SBPL (PNZ) – Petrolina Airport – Petrolina, Pernambuco
 SBPN (PNB) – Porto Nacional Airport – Porto Nacional, Goiás
 SBPO (PTO) – Juvenal Loureiro Cardoso Airport – Pato Branco, Paraná
 SBPP (PMG) – Ponta Porã International Airport – Ponta Porã, Mato Grosso do Sul
 SBPR – Carlos Prates Airport – Belo Horizonte, Minas Gerais
 SBPS (BPS) – Porto Seguro Airport – Porto Seguro, Bahia
 SBPV (PVH) – Governador Jorge Teixeira de Oliveira International Airport – Porto Velho, Rondônia
 SBQV (VDC) – Vitória da Conquista Airport – Vitória da Conquista, Bahia
 SBRB (RBR) – Rio Branco International Airport(Presidente Medici Airport) – Rio Branco, Acre
 SBRD (RBR) – Maestro Marinho Franco Airport – Rondonópolis, Mato Grosso
 SBRF (REC) – Guararapes International Airport (Gilberto Freyre Int'l) – Recife, Pernambuco
 SBRG (RIG) – Rio Grande Airport – Rio Grande, Rio Grande do Sul
 SBRJ (SDU) – Santos Dumont Regional Airport – Rio de Janeiro, Rio de Janeiro
 SBRP (RAO) – Leite Lopes Airport – Ribeirão Preto, São Paulo
 SBRR (BRB) – Barreirinhas Airport – Barreirinhas, Maranhão
 SBSC (SNZ) – Santa Cruz Air Force Base – Santa Cruz, Rio de Janeiro
 SBSG (NAT) – Gov. Aluízio Alves International Airport – Natal / São Gonçalo do Amarante, Rio Grande do Norte
 SBSJ (SJK) – São José dos Campos Regional Airport – São José dos Campos, São Paulo
 SBSL (SLZ) – Marechal Cunha Machado International Airport – São Luís, Maranhão
 SBSM (RIA) – Santa Maria Airport – Santa Maria, Rio Grande do Sul
 SBSN (STM) – Santarém-Maestro Wilson Fonseca Airport – Santarém, Pará
 SBSO (SMT) – Adolino Bedin Regional Airport – Sorriso, Mato Grosso
 SBSP (CGH) – Congonhas-São Paulo International Airport – São Paulo, São Paulo
 SBSR (SJP) – São José do Rio Preto Airport – São José do Rio Preto, São Paulo
 SBST (SSZ) – Santos Air Force Base – Santos, São Paulo
 SBSV (SSA) – Deputado Luís Eduardo Magalhães International Airport (Dois de Julho Airport) – Salvador, Bahia
 SBSY (IDO) – Santa Isabel do Morro Airport – Santa Isabel do Morro, Tocantins
 SBTA (QHP) – Heliponto Airport – Taubaté, São Paulo
 SBTB (TMT) – Porto Trombetas Airport – Trombetas, Pará
 SBTC (UNA) – Una-Comandatuba Airport – Una, Bahia
 SBTD (UNA) – Luiz dal Canalle Filho Airport – Toledo, Paraná, Paraná
 SBTE (THE) – Teresina Airport – Teresina, Piauí
 SBTF (TFF) – Tefé Airport – Tefé, Amazonas
 SBTG (TJL) – Plínio Alarcom Airport – Três Lagoas, Mato Grosso do Sul
 SBTI (OBI) – Óbidos Airport – Óbidos, Pará
 SBTK (TRQ) – Tarauacá Airport – Tarauacá, Acre
 SBTL (TEC) – Telêmaco Borba Airport – Telêmaco Borba, Paraná
 SBTT (TBT) – Tabatinga International Airport – Tabatinga, Amazonas
 SBTU (TUR) – Tucuruí Airport – Tucuruí, Pará
 SBTX (QTB) – Tubarão Airport – Tubarão, Santa Catarina
 SBUA (SJL) – São Gabriel da Cachoeira Airport – São Gabriel da Cachoeira, Amazonas
 SBUF (PAV) – Paulo Afonso Airport – Paulo Afonso, Bahia
 SBUG (URG) – Ruben Berta International Airport – Uruguaiana, Rio Grande do Sul
 SBUL (UDI) – Uberlândia Airport – Uberlândia, Minas Gerais
 SBUP (URB) – Urubupungá Airport – Urubupungá, São Paulo
 SBUR (UBA) – Uberaba Airport – Uberaba, Minas Gerais
 SBUY (RPU) – Porto Urucu Airport – Coari, Amazonas
 SBVC (VDC) – Glauber Rocha Airport – Vitória da Conquista, Bahia
 SBVG (VAG) – Major-Brigadeiro Trompowsky Airport – Varginha, Minas Gerais
 SBVH (BVH) – Vilhena Airport – Vilhena, Rondônia
 SBVT (VIX) – Eurico de Aguiar Salles Airport – Vitória, Espírito Santo
 SBWX (STM) – Santarém Airport – Santarém, Pará
 SBYS (QPS) – Campo Fontenelle Airport – Pirassununga, São Paulo
 SBZM (IZA) – Zona da Mata Regional Airport – Juiz de Fora, Zona da Mata

SD 
 SDAE – São Pedro Municipal Airport – São Pedro, São Paulo
 SDAG (GDR) – Angra dos Reis Airport – Angra dos Reis, Rio de Janeiro
 SDAI – Americana Municipal Airport – Americana, São Paulo
 SDAM (CPQ) – Campo dos Amarais Airport – Campinas, São Paulo
 SDCA - Capão Bonito Airport – Capão Bonito, São Paulo
 SDCG (OLC) – Senadora Eunice Michiles Airport – São Paulo de Olivença, Amazonas
 SDCO (SOD) – Sorocaba Airport – Sorocaba, São Paulo
 SDDR – Dracena Airport – Dracena, São Paulo
 SDGX – Morro de São Paulo Airport – Morro de São Paulo / Cairu, Bahia
 SDIL – Fazenda Pedra Branca Airport – Angra dos Reis, Rio de Janeiro
 SDIM (TTY) - Aeroporto de Itanhaém - Itanhaém, São Paulo
 SDIY (FEC) - Gov. João Durval Carneiro Airport - Feira de Santana, Bahia
 SDLP (QGC) – Lençóis Paulista Airport – Lençóis Paulista, São Paulo
 SDMC – Maricá Airport – Maricá, Rio de Janeiro
 SDMO – Monte Alto Airport – Monte Alto, São Paulo
 SDNM (DNM) – Brig. Eduardo Gomes Airport – Nova Mutum, Mato Grosso
 SDNY – Nova Iguaçu Aeroclub – Nova Iguaçu, Rio de Janeiro
 SDOM – Hospital Montreal Airport – Osasco, São Paulo
 SDOU (OUS) – Jornalista Benedito Pimentel Airport – Ourinhos, São Paulo
 SDOW (OIA) – Ourilândia do Norte Airport – Ourilândia do Norte, Pará
 SDPE (PNB) – Porto Nacional Airport – Porto Nacional, Tocantins
 SDPW – Piracicaba Aeroclub – Piracicaba, São Paulo
 SDRR (QVP) – Avaré Airport – Avaré, São Paulo
 SDRS (REZ) – Resende Airport – Resende, Rio de Janeiro
 SDSC (QSC) – São Carlos Airport – São Carlos, São Paulo
 SDTK (JPY) – Paraty Airport – Paraty, Rio de Janeiro
 SDUB (UBT) - Aeroporto Estadual de Ubatuba/Gastão Madeira, Ubatuba
 SDUN (ITP) - Ernani do Amaral Peixoto Airport - Itaperuna, Rio de Janeiro
 SDVG (VOT) - Domingos Pignatari Airport - Votuporanga, São Paulo
 SDWQ (ALT) - Alenquer Airport - Alenquer, Pará
 SDZG - Pedro Teixeira Castelo Airport - Tauá, Ceará

SI 
 SIAB – Leda Mello Resende Airport – Três Pontas, Minas Gerais
 SIFV – Aeródromo Primo Bitti – Aracruz, Espírito Santo
 SILC (LVR) – Bom Futuro Municipal Airport – Lucas do Rio Verde, Mato Grosso
 SIMK (FRC) – Franca Airport – Franca, São Paulo
 SIZX (JUA) – Inácio Luís do Nascimento Airport – Juara, Mato Grosso

SJ 
 SJAU – Araguacema Airport – Araguacema, Tocantins
 SJBY – João Silva Airport – Santa Inês, Maranhão
 SJGU – Araguatins Airport – Araguatins, Tocantins
 SJNP (NPR) – Novo Progresso Airport – Novo Progresso, Pará
 SJRG (RIG) – Rio Grande Regional Airport – Rio Grande, Rio Grande do Sul

SN 
 SNAG – Araguari Airport – Araguari, Minas Gerais
 SNAI (APY) – Alto Parnaíba Airport – Alto Parnaíba, Maranhão
 SNAR (AMJ) – Almenara Airport – Almenara, Minas Gerais
 SNAX (AIF) – Assis Airport – Assis, São Paulo
 SNBA (BAT) – Chafei Amsei Airport – Barretos, São Paulo
 SNBJ – Belo Jardim Airport – Belo Jardim, Pernambuco
 SNBL (BVM) – Belmonte Airport – Belmonte, Bahia
 SNBR (BRA) – Barreiras Airport – Barreiras, Bahia
 SNBX (BQQ) – Barra Airport – Barra, Bahia
 SNCP (CTP) - Carutapera Airport - Carutapera, Maranhão
 SNDC (RDC) – Redenção Airport – Redenção, Pará
 SNDM (LEC) – Lençóis Airport – Lençóis, Bahia
 SNDT (DTI) – Diamantina Airport – Diamantina, Minas Gerais
 SNDV (DIQ) – Brigadeiro Cabral Airport – Divinópolis, Minas Gerais
 SNEC – Outeiro das Brisas Airport – Porto Seguro, Bahia
 SNEE – Vacaria Airport – Vacaria, Rio Grande do Sul
 SNFE – Alfenas Airport – Alfenas, Minas Gerais
 SNFX (SXX) – São Félix do Xingu Airport – São Félix do Xingu, Pará
 SNGA (GUZ) – Guarapari Airport – Guarapari, Espírito Santo
 SNGI (GNM) – Guanambi Airport – Guanambi, Bahia
 SNGN (QGP) – Garanhuns Airport – Garanhuns, Pernambuco
 SNHA (ITN) – Itabuna Airport – Itabuna, Bahia
 SNHS (SET) – Santa Magalhães Airport – Serra Talhada, Pernambuco
 SNIG (QIG) – Dr. Francisco Tomé da Frota Airport – Iguatu, Ceará
 SNJN (JNA) – Januária Airport – Januária, Minas Gerais
 SNJR (JDR) – Pref. Octávio de Almeida Neves Airport – São João del-Rei, Minas Gerais
 SNKE (CMP) – Santana do Araguaia Airport – Santana do Araguaia, Pará
 SNKI (CMP) – Raimundo de Andrade Airport – Cachoeiro de Itapemirim, Espírito Santo
 SNLO (SSO) – Comte. Luiz Carlos de Oliveira Airport – São Lourenço, Minas Gerais
 SNMA (MTE) – Monte Alegre Airport – Monte Alegre, Pará
 SNMU (MVS) – Mucuri Airport – Mucuri, Bahia
 SNMZ (PTQ) – Porto de Moz Airport – Porto de Moz, Pará
 SNOB (QBX) – Sobral Airport – Sobral, Ceará
 SNOE – Oeiras Airport – Oeiras, Piauí
 SNOU (FEJ) – Feijó Airport – Feijó, Acre
 SNOX (ORX) – Oriximiná Airport – Oriximiná, Pará
 SNPC (PCS) – Sen. Helvídio Nunes Airport – Picos, Piauí
 SNPD (POJ) – Pedro Pereira dos Santos Airport – Patos de Minas, Minas Gerais
 SNQU – Mucugê Airport – Mucugê, Bahia
 SNRJ (JRT) – Juruti Airport – Juruti, Pará
 SNSM – Salinópolis Airport – Salinópolis, Pará
 SNSW (SFK) – Soure Airport – Soure, Pará
 SNTF (TXF) – 9 de maio Airport – Teixeira de Freitas, Bahia
 SNTI (OBI) – Óbidos Airport – Óbidos, Pará
 SNTO (TFL) – Teófilo Otoni Airport – Teófilo Otoni, Minas Gerais
 SNTS – Brig. Firmino Ayres Airport – Patos, Paraíba
 SNVB (VAL) – Valença Airport – Valença, Bahia
 SNVS (BVS) – Breves Airport – Breves, Pará
 SNWC (CMC) – Camocim Airport – Camocim, Ceará
 SNWS – Crateús Airport – Crateús, Ceará
 SNYA (GGF) – Almeirim Airport – Almeirim, Pará
 SNYE (PHI) – Pinheiro Airport – Pinheiro, Maranhão

SS 
 SSAL (ALQ) – Federal Airport – Alegrete, Rio Grande do Sul
 SSAP (APU) – Apucarana Airport – Apucarana, Paraná
 SSBL (BNU) – Blumenau Airport – Blumenau, Santa Catarina
 SSBZ (BZC) – Umberto Modiano Airport – Armação dos Búzios, Rio de Janeiro
 SSCK (CCI) – Concórdia Airport – Concórdia, Santa Catarina
 SSCN (CEL) – Canela Airport – Canela, Rio Grande do Sul
 SSCP (CKO) – Cornélio Procópio Airport – Cornélio Procópio, Paraná
 SSCT (GGH) – Cianorte Airport – Cianorte, Paraná
 SSDO (DOU) – Dourados Airport – Dourados, Mato Grosso do Sul
 SSER (ERM) – Erechim Airport – Erechim, Rio Grande do Sul
 SSFB (FBE) – Paulo Abdala Airport – Francisco Beltrão, Paraná
 SSGB (GTB) – Guaratuba Airport – Guaratuba, Paraná
 SSGG (GPB) – Guarapuava Airport – Guarapuava, Paraná
 SSGY (GGJ) – Guaíra Airport – Guaíra, Paraná
 SSIJ (IJU) – João Batista Bos Filho Airport – Ijuí, Rio Grande do Sul
 SSIM (CCM) – Diomício Freitas Airport – Criciúma / Forquilhinha, Santa Catarina
 SSJA (JCB) – Joaçaba Airport – Joaçaba, Santa Catarina
 SSKM (CBW) – Campo Mourão Airport – Campo Mourão, Paraná
 SSKW (OAL) – Cacoal Airport – Cacoal, Rondônia
 SSLT (ALQ) – Alegrete Airport – Alegrete, Rio Grande do Sul
 SSOE (SQX) – São Miguel do Oeste Airport – São Miguel do Oeste, Santa Catarina
 SSOG (APX) – Arapongas Airport – Arapongas, Paraná
 SSOU (AIR) – Aripuanã Airport – Aripuanã, Mato Grosso
 SSPB (PTO) – Pato Branco Airport – Pato Branco, Paraná
 SSPG (PNG) – Paranaguá Airport – Paranaguá, Paraná
 SSPI (PVI) – Edu Chaves Airport – Paranavaí, Paraná
 SSPK – Porecatu Airport – Porecatu, Paraná
 SSPS – Palmas Airport (Paraná) – Palmas, Paraná
 SSRS (BRB) – Barreirinhas Airport – Barreirinhas, Maranhão
 SSSB (JBS) – São Borja Airport – São Borja, Rio Grande do Sul
 SSSC (CSU) – Luiz Beck da Silva Airport – Santa Cruz do Sul, Rio Grande do Sul
 SSST – Santiago Airport – Santiago, Rio Grande do Sul
 SSTB  – Três Barras Airport - Três Barras, Santa Catarina
 SSTE (TSQ) – Torres Airport – Torres, Rio Grande do Sul
 SSUM (UMU) – Umuarama Airport – Umuarama, Paraná
 SSUV (UVI) – União da Vitória Airport – União da Vitória, Paraná
 SSVI (VIA) – Videira Airport – Videira, Santa Catarina
 SSVL (TEC) – Telêmaco Borba Airport – Telêmaco Borba, Paraná
 SSVN – Veranópolis Airport – Veranópolis, Rio Grande do Sul
 SSYA (AAG) – Avelino Vieira Airport – Arapoti, Paraná
 SSZR (SRA) – Santa Rosa Airport – Santa Rosa, Rio Grande do Sul

SW 
 SWBC (BAZ) – Barcelos Airport – Barcelos, Amazonas
 SWBE (JSB) – São Benedito Airport – São Benedito, Ceará
 SWBG (LCB) – Pontes e Lacerda Airport – Pontes e Lacerda, Mato Grosso
 SWBI – Barreirinha Airport – Barreirinha, Amazonas
 SWBR (RBB) – Borba Airport – Borba, Amazonas
 SWCA (CAF) – Carauari Airport – Carauari, Amazonas
 SWEI (ERN) – Eirunepé Airport – Eirunepé, Amazonas
 SWEK (CQA) – Canarana Airport – Canarana, Mato Grosso
 SWFX (SXO) – São Félix do Araguaia Airport – São Félix do Araguaia, Mato Grosso
 SWGI (GRP) – Gurupi Airport – Gurupi, Tocantins
 SWGN (AUX) – Araguaína Airport – Araguaína, Tocantins
 SWHP (GGB) – Água Boa Airport – Água Boa, Mato Grosso
 SWII (IPG) – Ipiranga Airport – Santo Antônio do Içá, Amazonas
 SWIQ (MQH) – Minaçu Airport – Minaçu, Goiás
 SWJI (JPR) – Ji-Paraná Airport – Ji-Paraná, Rondônia
 SWJN (JIA) – Juína Airport – Juína, Mato Grosso
 SWJU (JRN) – Juruena Airport – Juruena, Mato Grosso
 SWKC (CCX) – Cáceres Airport – Cáceres, Mato Grosso
 SWKN (CLV) – Caldas Novas Airport – Caldas Novas, Goiás
 SWKO (CIZ) – Coari Airport – Coari, Amazonas
 SWKQ (SRN) – São Raimundo Nonato Airport – São Raimundo Nonato, Piauí
 SWKT (TLZ) – Catalão Airport – Catalão, Goiás
 SWLB (LBR) – Lábrea Airport – Lábrea, Amazonas
 SWLC (RVD) – General Leite de Castro Airport – Rio Verde, Goiás
 SWMW (MBZ) – Maués Airport – Maués, Amazonas
 SWNK (BCR) – Novo Campo Airport – Boca do Acre, Amazonas
 SWNS (APS) – Anapolis Airport – Anápolis, Goiás
 SWOB (FBA) – Fonte Boa Airport – Fonte Boa, Amazonas
 SWPG (PBV) – Porto dos Gaúchos Airport – Porto dos Gaúchos, Mato Grosso
 SWPI (PIN) – Julio Belém Airport – Parintins, Amazonas
 SWPQ (PBX) – Fazenda Piraguassu Airport – Porto Alegre do Norte, Mato Grosso
 SWPY – Primavera do Leste Airport – Primavera do Leste, Mato Grosso
 SWRA (AAI) – Arraias Airport – Arraias, Tocantins
 SWRD (ROO) – Rondonópolis Airport – Rondonópolis, Mato Grosso
 SWSI (OPS) – Presidente João Figueiredo Airport - Sinop, Mato Grosso
 SWST (STZ) – Santa Terezinha Airport - Santa Terezinha, Mato Grosso
 SWTP (IRZ) – Tapuruquara Airport - Santa Isabel do Rio Negro, Amazonas
 SWTS (TGQ) – Tangará da Serra Airport - Tangará da Serra, Mato Grosso
 SWVC (VLP) – Vila Rica Airport - Vila Rica, Mato Grosso
 SWXM (MBK) – Matupá Airport - Matupá, Mato Grosso
 SWXV (NOK) – Nova Xavantina Airport – Nova Xavantina, Mato Grosso
 SWYM – Fazenda Anhanguera Airport – Pontes e Lacerda, Mato Grosso

SC - Chile 

 SCAC (ZUD) – Pupelde Airport – Ancud
 SCAG (LSQ) – El Avellano Airport – Los Ángeles
 SCAP (WAP) – Alto Palena Airport – Alto Palena
 SCAR (ARI) – Chacalluta International Airport – Arica
 SCBA (BBA) – Balmaceda Airport – Balmaceda
 SCBE (TOQ) – Barriles Airport – Tocopilla
 SCBQ – El Bosque Airport – El Bosque, Santiago
 SCCC (CCH) – Chile Chico Airport – Chile Chico
 SCCF (CJC) – El Loa Airport – Calama
 SCCH (YAI) – General Bernardo O'Higgins Airport – Chillán
 SCCI (PUQ) – Presidente Carlos Ibáñez del Campo International Airport – Punta Arenas
 SCCY (GXQ) – Teniente Vidal Airport – Coyhaique
 SCDA (IQQ) – Diego Aracena International Airport – Iquique
 SCEL (SCL) – Comodoro Arturo Merino Benítez International Airport – Santiago
 SCER – Quintero Airport – Valparaíso
 SCES (ESR) – El Salvador Bajo Airport – El Salvador
 SCFA (ANF) – Cerro Moreno International Airport – Antofagasta
 SCFM (WPR) – Capitán Fuentes Martinez Airport – Porvenir
 SCGZ (WPU) – Guardia Marina Zañartu Airport – Puerto Williams
 SCHA (CPO) – Chamonate Airport – Copiapó
 SCHR (LGR) – Cochrane Airport – Cochrane
 SCIC (ZCQ) – General Freire Airport – Curicó
 SCIE (CCP) – Carriel Sur International Airport – Concepción
 SCIP (IPC) – Mataveri International Airport – Easter Island (Isla de Pascua)
 SCIR – Robinson Crusoe Airfield – Juan Fernández Islands
 SCJO (ZOS) – Canal Bajo Airport – Osorno
 SCKU (QUI) – Chuquicamata Airport – Chuquicamata
 SCLC – Municipal de Vitacura Airport – Santiago
 SCLL (VLR) – Vallenar Airport – Vallenar
 SCNR - Fundo Naicura Airport (closed) - Rengo
 SCNT (PNT) – Teniente Julio Gallardo Airport – Puerto Natales
 SCOV (OVL) – El Tuqui Airport – Ovalle
 SCPC (ZPC) – Pucón Airport – Pucón
 SCPQ (MHC) – Mocopulli Airport – Dalcahue
 SCPZ – Patriot Hills – Antarctica
 SCRA (CNR) – Chañaral Airport – Chañaral
 SCRG (QRC) – Rancagua de la Independencia Airport – Rancagua
 SCRM (TNM) – Teniente R. Marsh Airport – Base Presidente Eduardo Frei Montalva and Villa Las Estrellas
 SCSB (SMB) – Franco Bianco Airport – Cerro Sombrero
 SCSE (LSC) – La Florida Airport – La Serena
 SCSN – Santo Domingo Airfield – Valparaíso
 SCST (WCA) – Gamboa Airport – Castro
 SCTB – Eulogio Sánchez Airport – La Reina, Santiago
 SCTC (PZS) – Maquehue Airport – Temuco

 SCTE (PMC) – El Tepual International Airport – Puerto Montt
 SCTI (ULC) – Los Cerrillos Airport – Santiago
 SCTL (TLX) – Panguilemo Airport – Talca
 SCTN (WCH) – Chaitén Airfield – Chaitén
 SCTO (ZIC) – Victoria Airport – Victoria
 SCTT (TTC) – Las Breas Airport – Taltal
 SCVA (VAP) – Viñamar Airport – Casablanca
 SCVD (ZAL) – Pichoy Airport – Valdivia
 SCVL       – Las Marías Airport – Valdivia
 SCVM (KNA) – Viña del Mar Airport – Viña del Mar

SE - Ecuador 

 SEAM (ATF) – Chachoan Airport – Ambato
 SEBC (BHA) – Los Perales Airport – Bahía de Caráquez
 SECA (LOH) – Ciudad de Catamayo Airport – Loja
 SECE (WSE) – Santa Cecilia Airport – Santa Cecilia
 SECO (OCC) – Francisco de Orellana Airport – Coca
 SECU (CUE) – Mariscal Lamar Airport – Cuenca
 SEGS (GPS) – Seymour Airport – Galápagos (Baltra)
 SEGU (GYE) – José Joaquín de Olmedo International Airport – Guayaquil
 SEJI (JIP) – Jipijapa Airport – Jipijapa
 SELT (LTX) – Cotopaxi International Airport – Latacunga
 SEMA (MRR) – J. M. Velasco Ibarra Airport – Macará
 SEMC (XMS) – Macas Airport – Macas
 SEMH (MCH) – General M. Serrano Airport – Machala
 SEMT (MEC) – Eloy Alfaro International Airport – Manta
 SENL (LGQ) – Lago Agrio Airport – Lago Agrio
 SEPD (PDZ) – Pedernales Airport – Pedernales
 SEPT (PYO) – Putumayo Airport – Putumayo
 SEPV (PVO) – Reales Tamarindos Airport – Portoviejo
 SEQM (UIO) – Mariscal Sucre International Airport – Quito
 SERO (ETR) – Santa Rosa International Airport – El Oro Province
 SESA (SNC) – General Ulpiano Paez Airport – Salinas
 SESC (SUQ) – Sucúa Airport – Sucúa
 SESM (PTZ) – Río Amazonas Airport – Pastaza
 SEST (SCY) – San Cristóbal Airport – San Cristóbal Island, Galápagos Islands
 SETA (TAU) – Taura – Base Aerea Taura, Guayas
 SETH (TSC) – Taisha Airport – Taisha
 SETI (TPN) – Tiputini Airport – Tiputini
 SETN (ESM) – General Rivadeneira Airport – Esmeraldas
 SETR (TPC) – Tarapoa Airport – Tarapoa
 SETU (TUA) – Teniente Coronel Luis A. Mantilla International Airport – Tulcán

SF - Falkland Islands 

 SFAL (PSY) – Port Stanley Airport – Stanley, Falkland Islands

SG - Paraguay 

 SGAS (ASU) – Silvio Pettirossi International Airport – Asunción
 SGAY (AYO) – Juan de Ayolas Airport – Ayolas
 SGCO (CIO) – Teniente Coronel Carmelo Peralta Airport – Concepción
 SGEN (ENO) – Teniente Primero Alarcón Airport – Encarnación
 SGES (AGT) – Guaraní International Airport – Ciudad del Este
 SGFI (FLM) – Fernheim Airport – Filadelfia
 SGME (ESG) – Dr. Luis María Argaña International Airport – Mariscal Estigarribia
 SGPI (PIL) – Carlos Miguel Jiménez Airport – Pilar
 SGPJ (PJC) – Augusto R. Fuster International Airport – Pedro Juan Caballero

SK - Colombia 

 SKAA       – Caño Garza Airport – Caño Garza
 SKAC (ACR) – Araracuara Airport – Araracuara
 SKAD (ACD) – Alcides Fernández Airport – Acandí
 SKAG (ACL) – Hacaritama Airport – Aguachica
 SKAL       – Calenturitas Airport – Calenturitas
 SKAM (AFI) – Amalfi Airport – Amalfi
 SKAN (ADN) – Andes Airport – Andes
 SKAP (API) – Gomez Nino-Apiay Airport – Apiay
 SKAR (AXM) – El Edén International Airport – Armenia
 SKAS (PUU) – Tres de Mayo Airport – Puerto Asís
 SKAT (ARQ) – El Troncal Airport – Arauquita
 SKBC (ELB) – Las Flores Airport – El Banco
 SKBE       – Becerril Airport – Becerril
 SKBG (BGA) – Palonegro International Airport – Lebrija (near Bucaramanga)
 SKBM (NBB) – Barranco Minas Airport – Barranco Minas
 SKBO (BOG) – El Dorado International Airport – Bogotá
 SKBQ (BAQ) – Ernesto Cortissoz International Airport – Barranquilla
 SKBR       – Berástegui Airport – Berástegui
 SKBS (BSC) – José Celestino Mutis Airport – Bahía Solano
 SKBU (BUN) – Gerardo Tobar López Airport – Buenaventura
 SKCA (CPB) – Capurganá Airport – Capurganá
 SKCB       – El Carmen de Bolívar Airport – El Carmen de Bolívar
 SKCC (CUC) – Camilo Daza International Airport – Cúcuta
 SKCD (COG) – Mandinga Airport – Condoto
 SKCE       – Cruz Verde Airport – Ibagué
 SKCG (CTG) – Rafael Núñez International Airport – Cartagena
 SKCI (CCO) – Carimagua Airport – Carimagua
 SKCL (CLO) – Alfonso Bonilla Aragón International Airport – Cali
 SKCM (CIM) – Cimitarra Airport – Cimitarra
 SKCN (RAV) – Cravo Norte Airport – Cravo Norte
 SKCO (TCO) – La Florida Airport – Tumaco
 SKCP (BHF) – Bahía Cupica Airport – Bahía Cupica
 SKCR (CUO) – Carurú Airport – Carurú
 SKCU (CAQ) – Juan H. White Airport – Caucasia
 SKCV (CVE) – Coveñas Airport – Coveñas
 SKCZ (CZU) – Las Brujas Airport – Corozal
 SKDU       – Caño Gandul Airport – Caño Gandul
 SKEB (EBG) – El Bagre Airport – El Bagre
 SKEH (ECR) – El Charco Airport – El Charco
 SKEJ (EJA) – Yariguíes Airport – Barrancabermeja
 SKFL (FLA) – Gustavo Artunduaga Paredes Airport – Florencia
 SKFU       – Fundación Airport – Fundación
 SKGI (GIR) – Santiago Vila Airport – Girardot
 SKGO (CRC) – Santa Ana Airport – Cartago
 SKGP (GPI) – Guapi Airport – Guapi
 SKGY       – Flaminio Suárez Camacho Airport – Bogotá / Chía
 SKGZ       – Garzón Airport – Garzón
 SKHA (CPL) – General Navas Pardo Airport – Chaparral
 SKHC (HTZ) – Hato Corozal Airport – Hato Corozal
 SKIB (IBE) – Perales Airport – Ibagué
 SKIG (IGO) – Jaime Ortiz Betancur Airport – Chigorodó
 SKIO       – Cicuco Airport – Cicuco
 SKIP (IPI) – San Luis Airport – Ipiales
 SKIU (TIB) – Tibú Airport – Tibú
 SKJU (JUO) – Juradó Airport – Juradó
 SKLB       – El Borrego Airport – El Borrego
 SKLC (APO) – Antonio Roldán Betancourt Airport – Apartadó
 SKLG (LQM) – Caucayá Airport – Puerto Leguízamo
 SKLM (MCJ) – La Mina Airport – Maicao
 SKLP (LPD) – La Pedrera Airport – La Pedrera
 SKLT (LET) – Alfredo Vásquez Cobo International Airport – Leticia
 SKMD (EOH) – Olaya Herrera Airport – Medellín
 SKMF (MFS) – Miraflores Airport – Miraflores
 SKMG (MGN) – Baracoa Airport – Magangué
 SKMR (MTR) – Los Garzones Airport – Montería
 SKMU (MVP) – Fabio Alberto León Bentley Airport – Mitú
 SKMZ (MZL) – La Nubia Airport – Manizales
 SKNC (NCI) – Antioquia Airport – Necoclí
 SKNQ (NQU) – Reyes Murillo Airport – Nuquí
 SKNV (NVA) – Benito Salas – Neiva
 SKOC (OCV) – Aguas Claras Airport – Ocaña
 SKOE (ORC) – Orocue Airport – Orocué
 SKOT (OTU) – Otú Airport – Otú
 SKPB – Puerto Bolívar Airport – La Guajira Department
 SKPC (PCR) – Puerto Carreño Airport – Puerto Carreño
 SKPD (PDA) – Obando Airport – Puerto Inírida
 SKPE (PEI) – Matecaña International Airport – Pereira
 SKPI (PTX) – Contador Airport – Pitalito
 SKPL (PLT) – Plato Airport – Plato
 SKPP (PPN) – Guillermo León Valencia Airport – Popayán
 SKPQ (PQE) – Captain Germán Olano Moreno Air Base – Palanquero
 SKPS (PSO) – Antonio Nariño Airport – Pasto
 SKPV (PVA) – El Embrujo Airport – Providencia Island
 SKPZ (PZA) – Paz de Ariporo Airport – Paz de Ariporo
 SKQU (MQU) – Mariquita Airport – Mariquita
 SKRG (MDE) – José María Córdova International Airport – Medellín/Rionegro
 SKRH (RCH) – Almirante Padilla Airport – Riohacha
 SKRO       – Corocora Airport – Corocora
 SKSA (RVE) – Los Colonizadores Airport – Saravena
 SKSJ (SJE) – Jorge Enrique González Torres Airport – San José del Guaviare
 SKSM (SMR) – Simón Bolívar International Airport – Santa Marta
 SKSP (ADZ) – Gustavo Rojas Pinilla International Airport (Sesquicentenario Airport) – San Andrés
 SKSR (SRS) – San Marcos Airport – San Marcos
 SKSV (SVI) – Eduardo Falla Solano Airport – San Vicente del Caguán
 SKTD (TDA) – Trinidad Airport – Trinidad
 SKTJ (TNJ) – Gustavo Rojas Pinilla International Airport – Tunja
 SKTL (TLU) – Golfo de Morrosquillo Airport – Tolú
 SKTM (TME) – Gabriel Vargas Santos Airport – Tame
 SKTQ (TQS) – Captain Ernesto Esguerra Cubides Air Base – Tres Esquinas
 SKTU (TRB) – Gonzalo Mejía Airport – Turbo
 SKUA (MQZ) – Colonel Luis Arturo Rodríguez Meneses Air Base – Marandúa
 SKUC (AUC) – Santiago Pérez Quiroz Airport – Arauca
 SKUI (UIB) – El Caraño Airport – Quibdó
 SKUL (ULQ) – Farfan Airport – Tuluá
 SKUM       – Cumaribo Airport – Cumaribo
 SKUR (URR) – Urrao Airport – Urrao
 SKVG (VGZ) – Villa Garzón Airport – Villagarzón
 SKVP (VUP) – Alfonso López Pumarejo Airport – Valledupar
 SKVV (VVC) – La Vanguardia Airport – Villavicencio
 SKYA (AYG) – Yaguará Airport – Yaguará
 SKYP (EYP) – El Alcaraván Airport – Yopal

SL - Bolivia 

q.v.
 SLAL (SRE) - Alcantarí Airport – Sucre
 SLAP (APB) – Apolo Airport – Apolo
 SLAS (ASC) – Ascensión de Guarayos Airport – Ascensión de Guarayos
 SLBJ (BJO) – Bermejo Airport – Bermejo
 SLBN – Bella Unión Airport – Santa Ana del Yacuma 
 SLCA (CAM) – Camiri Airport – Camiri
 SLCB (CBB) – Jorge Wilstermann International Airport – Cochabamba
 SLCO (CIJ) – Captain Aníbal Arab Airport – Cobija
 SLCP (CEP) – Concepción Airport – Concepción
 SLET (SRZ) – El Trompillo Airport – Santa Cruz
 SLGY (GYA) – Guayaramerín Airport – Guayaramerín
 SLJE (SJS) – San José de Chiquitos Airport – San José de Chiquitos
 SLJO (SJB) – San Joaquín Airport – San Joaquín
 SLJV (SJV) – San Javier Airport – San Javier
 SLLP (LPB) – El Alto International Airport – La Paz
 SLMG (MGD) – Magdalena Airport – Magdalena
 SLOR (ORU) – Oruro Airport – Oruro
 SLPO (POI) – Captain Nicolas Rojas Airport – Potosí
 SLPR (PUR) – Puerto Rico Airport – Puerto Rico
 SLPS (PSZ) – Puerto Suárez International Airport – Puerto Suárez
 SLRA (SRD) – San Ramón Airport – San Ramón
 SLRB (RBO) – Roboré Airport – Roboré
 SLRI (RIB) – Riberalta Airport – Riberalta
 SLRQ (RBQ) – Rurrenabaque Airport – Rurrenabaque
 SLRY (REY) – Reyes Airport – Reyes
 SLSA (SBL) – Santa Ana del Yacuma Airport – Santa Ana del Yacuma
 SLSB (SRJ) – Capitán Germán Quiroga Guardia Airport – San Borja
 SLSI (SNG) – San Ignacio de Velasco Airport – San Ignacio de Velasco
 SLSM (SNM) – San Ignacio de Moxos Airport – San Ignacio de Moxos
 SLSU – Juana Azurduy de Padilla International Airport – Sucre
 SLTJ (TJA) – Capitán Oriel Lea Plaza Airport – Tarija
 SLTR (TDD) – Teniente Jorge Henrich Arauz Airport – Trinidad
 SLVM (VLM) – Villamontes Airport – Villamontes
 SLVR (VVI) – Viru Viru International Airport – Santa Cruz
 SLYA (BYC) – Yacuiba Airport – Yacuiba

SM - Suriname 

 SMAF – Afobaka Airstrip – Afobaka
 SMAM – Amatopo Airstrip – Amatopo
 SMAN – Lawa Antino Airstrip – Benzdorp
 SMBG – Bakhuys Airstrip – Bakhuys Gebergte
 SMBN (ABN) – Albina Airstrip – Albina, Marowijne District
 SMBO (BTO) – Botopasi Airstrip – Botopasi
 SMCA (AAJ) – Cayana Airstrip – Cayana
 SMCB – Cabana Airstrip – Cabana
 SMCI – Coeroenie Airstrip – Coeroeni
 SMCO (TOT) – Totness Airstrip – Totness, Coronie District
 SMCT – Lawa Cottica Airstrip – Cottica
 SMDA (DRJ) – Drietabbetje Airstrip – Drietabbetje
 SMDJ (DOE) – Djoemoe Airstrip (Djumu / Asidonhopo) – Djoemoe
 SMDK – Donderskamp Airstrip – Donderskamp
 SMDO (LDO) – Laduani Airstrip – Laduani
 SMDU – Alalapadu Airstrip – Alalapadu
 SMGA – Gakaba Airstrip – Gakaba
 SMGH – Godo Holo Airstrip – Godo Holo
 SMGR – Gross Rosebell Airstrip – Rosebel gold mine
 SMHA – Henri Alwies Airstrip – Saramacca District
 SMJA – Jarikaba Airstrip – Jarikaba, Saramacca District
 SMJK – Njoeng Jacob Kondre Airstrip – Njoeng Jacob Kondre
 SMJP (PBM) – Johan Adolf Pengel International Airport (Zanderij Int'l) – Zanderij / Paramaribo
 SMKA – Kabalebo Airstrip – Kabalebo
 SMKM – Kami Kami Airstrip – Kami Kami mining camp
 SMKE – Kayser Airstrip – Kayser Mountains
 SMLA – Lawa Anapaike Airstrip – Anapaikë
 SMLI – Lelygebergte Airstrip – Lelygebergte
 SMLT – Langatabbetje Airstrip – Langatabbetje
 SMMO (MOJ) – Moengo Airstrip – Moengo Marowijne District
 SMNI (ICK) – Nieuw-Nickerie Airport – Nieuw-Nickerie (New Nickerie)
 SMPA (OEM) – Vincent Fayks Airport – Paloemeu
 SMPE – Poeketi Airstrip – Poeketi
 SMPG – Poesoegroenoe Airstrip – Poesoegroenoe
 SMPT – Apetina Airstrip – Apetina
 SMRA – Raleigh Airstrip (Raleighvallen / Voltzberg) – Raleighvallen
 SMRN – Ragoebarsing Airstrip – Ragoebarsing
 SMSI – Sipaliwini Airstrip – Sipaliwini Savanna
 SMSK – Sarakreek Airstrip – Sarakreek
 SMSM – Kwamelasemoetoe Airstrip – Kwamelasemoetoe
 SMST (SMZ) – Stoelmans Eiland Airstrip – Stoelmanseiland
 SMTA – Lawa Tabiki Airstrip – Lawa Tabiki
 SMTB – Tafelberg Airstrip – Tafelberg
 SMTP (KCB) – Tepoe Airstrip (Kassi Kassima) – Pelelu Tepu
 SMVG – Vier Gebroeders Airstrip – Vier Gebroeders
 SMVO – Avanavero Airstrip – Avanavero
 SMWA (AGI) – Wageningen Airstrip – Wageningen
 SMWS (WSO) – Washabo Airport – Washabo Apoera
 SMZO (ORG) – Zorg en Hoop Airport – Paramaribo

SO - French Guiana 

 SOCA (CAY) – Cayenne-Rochambeau Airport – Cayenne
 SOGS       – Grand-Santi Airport – Grand-Santi
 SOOA (MPY) – Maripasoula Airport – Maripasoula
 SOOG (OXP) – Saint-Georges-de-l'Oyapock Airport – Saint-Georges-de-l'Oyapock
 SOOM (LDX) – Saint-Laurent-du-Maroni Airport – Saint-Laurent-du-Maroni
 SOOR (REI) – Régina Airport – Régina
 SOOS (XAU) – Saül Airport – Saül
 SOOY       – Sinnamary Airport – Sinnamary

SP - Peru 

 SPAO (APE) – San Juan Aposento Airport – San Juan Aposento
 SPAR (ALD) – Alerta Airport – Alerta, Ucayali Region
 SPAS – Alférez FAP Alfredo Vladimir Sara Bauer Airport – Andoas, Loreto Region
 SPAY (AYX) – Tnte. Gral. Gerardo Pérez Pinedo Airport – Atalaya, Ucayali Region
 SPBB (MBP) – Moyobamba Airport – Moyobamba, San Martín Region
 SPBC – Caballococha Airport – Caballococha, Loreto Region
 SPBL (BLP) – Huallaga Airport – Bellavista, San Martín Region
 SPBR (IBP) – Iberia Airport – Iberia
 SPBS – Bellavista Airport – Jeberos, Loreto Region
 SPCH – Tocache Airport – Tocache, San Martín Region
 SPCL (PCL) – Capitán Rolden Airport (or Capitán FAP David Abenzur Rengifo Airport) – Pucallpa, Ucayali Region
 SPCM (CTF) – Contamana Airport – Contamana, Loreto Region
 SPDR – Trompeteros Airport – Corrientes
 SPEO (CHM) – Teniente FAP Jaime A. de Montreuil Morales Airport – Chimbote, Ancash Region
 SPEQ – Cesar Torque Podesta Airport – Moquegua, Moquegua Region
 SPGM (TGI) – Tingo María Airport – Tingo María, Huánuco Region
 SPHI (CIX) – FAP Captain José Abelardo Quiñones González International Airport – Chiclayo, Lambayeque Region
 SPHO (AYP) – Coronel FAP Alfredo Mendívil Duarte Airport – Ayacucho, Ayacucho Region
 SPHU – Huancayo Airport – Huancayo, Junín Region
 SPHV – Huánuco Viejo Airport – Huánuco Viejo, Huánuco Region
 SPHY (ANS) – Andahuaylas Airport – Andahuaylas, Apurímac Region
 SPHZ (ATA) – Comandante FAP Germán Arias Graziani Airport – Anta/Huaraz, Ancash Region
 SPIL (UMI) – Quince Mil Airport – Quince Mil, Cusco Region
 SPIP (SFK) – Satipo Airport – Satipo
 SPIZ (UCZ) – Uchiza Airport – Uchiza
 SPJA (RIJ) – Juan Simons Vela Airport – Rioja, San Martín Region
 SPJB – Pampa Grande Airport – Cajabamba, Cajamarca Region
 SPJC (LIM) – Jorge Chávez International Airport – Callao/Lima, Lima Metropolitan Area
 SPJE – Shumba Airport – Jaén, Cajamarca Region
 SPJI (JJI) – Juanjuí Airport – Juanjuí, San Martín Region
 SPJJ (JAU) – Francisco Carle Airport – Jauja, Junín Region
 SPJL (JUL) – Inca Manco Cápac International Airport – Puno/Juliaca, Puno Region
 SPJN (SJA) – San Juan de Marcona Airport – San Juan de Marcona
 SPJR (CJA) – Major General FAP Armando Revoredo Iglesias Airport – Cajamarca, Cajamarca Region
 SPLC – Mariano Melgar Airport – La Joya, Arequipa Region
 SPLN (RIM) – San Nicolas Airport – Rodríguez de Mendoza
 SPLO (ILC) – Ilo Airport – Ilo, Moquegua Region
 SPLP – Las Palmas Air Base (military) – Barranco, Lima Province
 SPME (TBP) – Capitán FAP Pedro Canga Rodríguez Airport – Tumbes, Tumbes Region
 SPMF – Manuel Prado Ugarteche Airport – Mazamari, Junín Region
 SPMR (SMG) – Santa Maria Airport, Peru – Santa Maria
 SPMS (YMS) – Moisés Benzaquén Rengifo Airport – Yurimaguas, Loreto Region
 SPNC (HUU) – Alférez FAP David Figueroa Fernandini Airport – Huánuco, Huánuco Region
 SPOA (SFS) – Saposoa Airport – Saposoa
 SPOV – Shiringayoc/Hacienda Mejia Airport – Leon Velarde
 SPPY (CHH) – Chachapoyas Airport – Chachapoyas, Amazonas Region
 SPQN (REQ) – Requena Airport – Requena, Loreto Region
 SPQT (IQT) – Coronel FAP Francisco Secada Vignetta International Airport – Iquitos, Loreto Region
 SPQU (AQP) – Rodríguez Ballón International Airport – Arequipa, Arequipa Region
 SPRF – San Rafael Airport – San Rafael
 SPRM – Capitán FAP Leonardo Alvariño Herr Airport – San Ramón, Junín Region
 SPRU (TRU) – Capitán FAP Carlos Martínez de Pinillos International Airport – Trujillo, La Libertad Region
 SPSF – San Francisco Airport – San Francisco
 SPSO (PIO) – Capitán FAP Renán Elías Olivera Airport – Pisco, Ica Region
 SPSP (SPO) – San Pablo Airport – San Pablo, Cajamarca Region
 SPST (TPP) – Comandante FAP Guillermo del Castillo Paredes Airport – Tarapoto, San Martín Region
 SPSY (SYC) – Shiringayoc Airport – Shiringayoc
 SPTN (TCQ) – Coronel FAP Carlos Ciriani Santa Rosa Airport – Tacna, Tacna Region
 SPTP – El Pato Air Base – Talara, Piura Region
 SPTU (PEM) – Padre Aldamiz International Airport – Puerto Maldonado, Madre de Dios Region
 SPUR (PIU) – Capitán FAP Guillermo Concha Iberico Airport – Piura/Talara, Piura Region
 SPVR – San Isidoro Airport – Vitor
 SPVT – Mayor FAP Guillermo Protset del Castillo Airport – Vitor
 SPYL (TYL) – Capitán FAP Víctor Montes Arias International Airport – Talara, Piura Region
 SPZA (NZC) – Maria Reiche Neuman Airport – Nazca, Ica Region

 SPZO (CUZ) – Subteniente FAP Alejandro Velasco Astete International Airport – Cusco, Cusco Region

SU - Uruguay 

 SUAA – Ángel Adami International Airport – Montevideo, Montevideo
 SUAG (ATI) – Artigas International Airport – Artigas, Artigas
 SUAN – Estancia Presidencial Anchorena Airport – Barra de San Juan, Colonia
 SUBU (BUV) – Placeres Airport – Bella Unión, Artigas
 SUCA (CYR) – Laguna de los Patos International Airport – Colonia del Sacramento, Colonia
 SUCM – Zagarzazú International Airport – Carmelo, Colonia
 SUDU (DZO) – Santa Bernardina International Airport – Durazno, Durazno
 SUFB – Villa Independencia Airport – Fray Bentos, Río Negro
 SULS (PDP) – C/C Carlos A. Curbelo de Laguna del Sauce International Airport – Maldonado/Punta del Este, Maldonado
 SUME – Ricardo Detomasi Airport – Mercedes, Soriano
 SUMI – Campo Municipal de Aterrizaje Airport – Minas, Lavalleja
 SUMO (MLZ) – Cerro Largo International Airport – Melo, Cerro Largo
 SUMU (MVD) – Carrasco Gral. Cesáreo L. Berisso International Airport – Montevideo, Montevideo
 SUPE – El Jagüel Airport – Maldonado/Punta del Este, Maldonado
 SUPU (PDU) – Tydeo Larre Borges International Airport – Paysandú, Paysandú
 SURB – Río Branco Airport – Río Branco, Cerro Largo
 SURV (RVY) – Pte. Gral. Óscar D. Gestido International Airport – Rivera, Rivera
 SUSO (STY) – Nueva Hespérides International Airport – Salto, Salto
 SUTB (TAW) – Tacuarembó Airport – Tacuarembó, Tacuarembó
 SUTR (TYT) – Treinta y Tres Airport – Treinta y Tres, Treinta y Tres
 SUVO (VCH) – Vichadero Airport – Vichadero, Rivera

SV - Venezuela 

 SVAC (AGV) – Oswaldo Guevara Mujica Airport – Acarigua
 SVAN (AAO) – Anaco Airport – Anaco, Anzoátegui
 SVAS (LPJ) – Armando Schwarck Airport – Los Pijiguaos, Bolívar
 SVBB – Private Airport central Bobures – Bobures, Zulia
 SVBC (BLA) – General José Antonio Anzoátegui International Airport – Barcelona, Anzoátegui
 SVBI (BNS) – Barinas Airport – Barinas, Barinas
 SVBL (MYC) – El Libertador Air Base – Maracay, Aragua
 SVBM (BRM) – Jacinto Lara International Airport – Barquisimeto
 SVBS (MYC) – Mariscal Sucre Airport (Venezuela) – Maracay, ragua
 SVCB (CBL) – Tomás de Heres Airport – Ciudad Bolívar, Bolívar
 SVCD (CXA) – Caicara del Orinoco Airport – Caicara del Orinoco
 SVCL (CLZ) – Calabozo Airport – Calabozo, Guárico
 SVCN (CAJ) – Canaima Airport – Canaima
 SVCO (VCR) – Carora Airport – Carora, Lara
 SVCP (CUP) – General José Francisco Bermúdez Airport – Carúpano
 SVCR (CZE) – José Leonardo Chirino Airport – Coro, Falcón
 SVCU (CUM) – Antonio José de Sucre Airport – Cumaná, Sucre
 SVDZ (PPZ) – Puerto Páez Airport – Puerto Páez, Apure
 SVED (EOR) – El Dorado Airport (Venezuela) – El Dorado
 SVEZ (EOZ) – Elorza Airport – Elorza, Apure
 SVFM – Generalissimo Francisco de Miranda Air Base – Caracas
 SVGD (GDO) – Guasdualito Airport – Guasdualito, Apure
 SVGI (GUI) – Güiria Airport – Güiria, Sucre
 SVGU (GUQ) – Guanare Airport – Guanare, Portuguesa
 SVHH – Churuguara Airport – Churuguara, Falcón
 SVIC (ICA) – Icabarú Airport – Icabaru, Bolívar
 SVJC (LSP) – Josefa Camejo International Airport – Paraguaná, Falcón
 SVKA (KAV) – Kavanayén Airport – Bolívar
 SVKM (KTV) – Kamarata Airport – Bolívar
 SVLF (LFR) – La Fría Airport – La Fría, Táchira
 SVLO – La Orchila Airport – La Orchila, Dependencias Federales (Venezuela)
 SVMC (MAR) – La Chinita International Airport – Maracaibo, Zulia
 SVMD (MRD) – Alberto Carnevalli Airport – Mérida, Mérida
 SVMG (PMV) – Del Caribe International Airport (Gen. Santiago Marino Airport) – Porlamar, Isla Margarita
 SVMI (CCS) – Simón Bolívar International Airport (Maiquetia International Airport) – Maiquetía, Vargas (near Caracas)
 SVMT (MUN) – Maturín Airport – Maturín, Monagas
 SVON (CBS) – Oro Negro Airport – Cabimas, Zulia
 SVPA (PYH) – Cacique Aramare Airport – Puerto Ayacucho, Amazonas
 SVPC (PBL) – General Bartolomé Salom Airport – Puerto Cabello, Carabobo
 SVPE – Pedernales Airport – Delta Amacuro
 SVPM (SCI) – Paramillo Airport – San Cristóbal, Táchira
 SVPR (CGU) – Manuel Carlos Piar Guayana Airport – Ciudad Guayana, Bolívar
 SVPT (PMT) – Palmarito Airport – Apure
 SVRS (LRV) – Los Roques Airport – Los Roques Dependencias Federales (Venezuela)
 SVSA (SVZ) – Juan Vicente Gómez International Airport – San Antonio del Táchira
 SVSE (SNV) – Santa Elena de Uairén Airport – Bolívar
 SVSO (STD) – Mayor Buenaventura Vivas Airport – Santo Domingo
 SVSP (SNF) – Sub Teniente Nestor Arias Airport – San-Felipe, Yaracuy
 SVSR (SFD) – Las Flecheras Airport – San Fernando de Apure, Apure
 SVST (SOM) – San Tomé Airport – San Tomé
 SVSZ (STB) – Miguel Urdaneta Fernández Airport – Santa Bárbara del Zulia
 SVTC (TUV) – San Rafael Airport – Tucupita, Delta Amacuro
 SVTM (TMO) – Tumeremo Airport – Tumeremo
 SVUM (URM) – Uriman Airport – Bolívar
 SVVA (VLN) – Arturo Michelena International Airport – Valencia
 SVVG (VIG) – Juan Pablo Pérez Alfonzo Airport – El Vigia
 SVVL (VLV) – Dr. Antonio Nicolás Briceño Airport – Valera, Trujillo

SY - Guyana 

 SYAH (AHL) – Aishalton Airport – Aishalton
 SYAN (NAI) – Annai Airport – Annai
 SYAP – Apoteri Airport – Apoteri
 SYAP – Awaruwaunau Airport – Awarewaunau
 SYBE (BCG) – Bemichi Airport
 SYBR (BMJ) – Baramita Airport – Baramita
 SYBT (GFO) – Bartica Airport – Bartica
 SYCJ (GEO) – Cheddi Jagan International Airport – Georgetown
 SYEB – Ebini Airport – Ebini
 SYGH – Good Hope Airport – Good Hope
 SYGO (OGL) – Ogle Airport – Georgetown
 SYIB (IMB) – Imbaimadai Airport – Imbaimadai
 SYKA (KAI) – Kaieteur International Airport – Kaieteur National Park
 SYKI – Kaow Island Airport – Kaow Island
 SYKK – Kurukabaru Airport – Kurukabaru
 SYKM (KAR) – Kamarang Airport – Kamarang
 SYKR (KRM) – Karanambo Airport – Karanambo
 SYKS (KRG) – Karasabai Airport – Karasabai
 SYKT (KTO) – Kato Airport – Kato
 SYKW – Kwakwani Airport – Kwakwani
 SYLD – Linden Airport – Linden
 SYLP (LUB) – Lumid Pau Airport – Lumid Pau
 SYLT (LTM) – Lethem Airport – Lethem
 SYMB (USI) – Mabaruma Airport – Mabaruma
 SYMD (MHA) – Mahdia Airport – Mahdia
 SYMM (MYM) – Monkey Mountain Airport – Monkey Mountain
 SYMN – Manari Airport – Manari
 SYMP (PMT) – Mountain Point Airport – Mountain Point
 SYMR (MWJ) – Matthews Ridge Airport – Matthews Ridge
 SYMW – Maruranawa Airport – Maruranau
 SYNA (QSX) – New Amsterdam Airport – New Amsterdam
 SYOR (ORJ) – Orinduik Airport – Orinduik
 SYPK (PKM) – Port Kaituma Airport – Port Kaituma
 SYPM (PMT) – Paramakatoi Airport – Paramakatoi
 SYPR (PRR) – Paruima Airport – Paruima
 SYSC (SDC) – Sand Creek Airport – Sand Creek
 SYWI – Wichabai Airport – Wichabai

Notes

References
 
  - includes IATA codes
 Aviation Safety Network - IATA and ICAO airport codes

S
ICAO code
Argentina transport-related lists
Bolivia transport-related lists
Chile transport-related lists
Colombia transport-related lists
Ecuador transport-related lists
Falkland Islands-related lists
French Guiana-related lists
Guyana transport-related lists
Paraguay transport-related lists
Peru transport-related lists
Suriname transport-related lists
Uruguay transport-related lists
Venezuela transport-related lists